John McCallum (born 1950) is a Canadian politician.

John McCallum may also refer to:
John McCallum (actor) (1918–2010), Australian actor
John McCallum (Australian politician) (1892–1973), Australian politician
John McCallum (badminton) (1883–1967), Irish badminton player and administrator
John McCallum (naval architect) (1920–1995), Scottish naval architect
John McCallum (sports writer) (1924–1988), American sportswriter and author
John Donaldson McCallum (fl. 1881–1926), Scottish minister
John McCallum (British politician) (1847–1920), Scottish soap manufacturer and politician

See also
John MacCallum (1883–1957), Scottish rugby union player